This is a complete list of members of the United States House of Representatives during the 115th United States Congress, which ran from January 3, 2017, through January 3, 2019, ordered by seniority.

Seniority list

Delegates

See also
 115th United States Congress
 List of current members of the United States House of Representatives
 List of United States congressional districts
 List of United States senators in the 115th Congress by seniority
 Seniority in the United States House of Representatives

References

External links
 
 

Seniority
115